Faders Up (Live) is a live album of the Belgian band Triggerfinger. The album was released on 12 March 2007, having been recorded during a concert in Antwerp, Belgium in September 2006.

Track list

Personnel
Ruben Block - lead vocals, guitar
Paul Van Bruystegem - bass guitar, backing vocals
Mario Goossens - drums, backing vocals

External links
Band's official website

2007 albums
Triggerfinger albums